Astroblepus chimborazoi is a species of catfish of the family Astroblepidae. It can be found in Ecuador.

References

Bibliography
Eschmeyer, William N., ed. 1998. Catalog of Fishes. Special Publication of the Center for Biodiversity Research and Information, num. 1, vol. 1–3. California Academy of Sciences. San Francisco, California, United States. 2905. .

Astroblepus
Endemic fauna of Ecuador
Freshwater fish of Ecuador
Fish described in 1915
Taxa named by Henry Weed Fowler